Entephria punctipes is a moth of the family Geometridae first described by John Curtis in 1835. It is found in the extreme north of the Palearctic and Nearctic realms.

Adults are on wing from June to July.

The larval food plants are unknown.

References

External links

Fauna Europaea
Svenska dagfjärilar och nattfjärilar 

Larentiini
Moths of Europe
Taxa named by John Curtis